General elections were held for the first time in Cambodia on 1 September 1946. The Democratic Party won 50 of the 67 seats, with voter turnout estimated to be 60%.

Results

References

Cambodia
Elections in Cambodia
General
Election and referendum articles with incomplete results